"" is the 41st single by Zard and released 8 March 2006 under B-Gram Records label. Kanashii Hodo Anata ga Suki wasn't included in their final studio album Kimi to no Distance, however it got released in their compilation album Brezza di mare: Dedicated to Izumi Sakai. Karatto Ikō! was released only in their compilation album  Zard Single Collection in 2012.

The single reached #6 rank first week. It charted for 14 weeks and sold over 32,000 copies.

Track list
All songs are written by Izumi Sakai, composed by Aika Ohno and arranged by Takeshi Hayama

 Shiori Takei participated in chorus
the song was used as 24th ending theme for anime Detective Conan for its 10 anniversary of broadcasting.

the song was used in Fuji TV program Mezamashi Doyoubi as theme song (from January till March 2006)
 (original karaoke)
 (original karaoke)

References

2006 singles
Zard songs
Case Closed songs
Songs written by Izumi Sakai
Songs written by Aika Ohno